WLIR may refer to:

 WLIR-FM, a radio station (107.1 FM) licensed to Hampton Bays, New York, United States

Former radio stations:
 WFME-FM, a radio station (92.7 FM) licensed to Garden City, New York, which used the WLIR call sign from 1959 to 1987, and again from 1996 to 2004
 WLIR, the radio station that played new music/modern rock originally heard on the frequencies 92.7 FM, 98.5 FM, and 107.1 FM from the 1980s into the 2000s
 WRCR, a radio station (1700 AM) licensed to Haverstraw, New York, which used the WLIR call sign from 1987 to 2000
 WBON, a radio station (98.5 FM) licensed to Westhampton, New York, which used the WLIR call sign in 1996